There are a number of proposed fixed connections—road or rail, bridge or tunnel—designed to connect the islands of Ireland and Great Britain, connect the island of Great Britain to mainland Europe, as well as to build other connections amongst the smaller islands in the British & Irish Isles.

Proposed fixed sea links between Great Britain and Ireland

History

Pre-20th century proposals 
The failure of the Union Bill 1799 (which succeeded, the next year, as the Act of Union 1800) prompted a satirical description of a proposal by "architect" William Pitt "to build a bridge from Holyhead to the Hill of Howth."

As part of the unionist movement, various roads were built across Great Britain heading towards Ireland; In 1803 William Madocks started building earthworks for a road to Porthdinllaen; this was rejected by Parliament in 1810 in favour of a London to Holyhead road, which was authorised in 1815, built by Thomas Telford, and opened in 1826.

Between 1886 and 1900, proposals for a link to Scotland were "seriously explored by engineers, industrialists, and Unionist politicians".
In 1885, Irish Builder and Engineer said a tunnel under the Irish Sea had been discussed "for some time back". In 1890, engineer Luke Livingston Macassey outlined a Stranraer–Belfast link by tunnel, submerged "tubular bridge", or solid causeway. In 1897 a British firm applied for £15,000 towards the cost of carrying out borings and soundings in the North Channel to see if a tunnel between Ireland and Scotland was viable. The link would have been of immense commercial benefit, was significant strategically and would have meant faster transatlantic travel from the United Kingdom, via Galway and other ports in Ireland. When Hugh Arnold-Foster asked in the Commons in 1897 about a North Channel tunnel, Arthur Balfour said "the financial aspects ... are not of a very promising character".

20th century 
In 1915, a tunnel was proposed by Gershom Stewart as a defence against a German U-boat blockade of Ireland but dismissed by H. H. Asquith as "hardly practicable in the present circumstances". In 1918, Stewart proposed that German prisoners of war might dig the tunnel; Bonar Law said the Select Committee on Transport could consider the matter.

The Senate of Northern Ireland debated a North Channel Tunnel on 25 May 1954.  In 1956 Harford Hyde, Unionist Westminster MP for North Belfast, raised a motion in the UK House of Commons for a tunnel across the North Channel. In 1980, John Biggs-Davison suggested European Economic Community involvement in a North Channel tunnel; Philip Goodhart said no tunnel was planned.

In 1988, John Wilson, the Irish Minister for Tourism and Transport, said his department estimated an Irish Sea tunnel would cost more than twice as much as the English Channel Tunnel and generate less than one-fifth of the revenue, thus being economically unviable. In 1997–98, the Department of Public Enterprise refused to fund a feasibility study requested by the engineering firm Symonds to build an immersed tube tunnel.

21st century
Symonds revived the plan in 2000, with an £8 million feasibility study and a £14 billion construction cost estimate. In 2005, the Irish Minister for Transport said he had not studied A Vision of Transport in Ireland in 2050, published in September 2004 by the Irish Academy of Engineering, a report which included a Wexford–Pembroke tunnel.

The proposal of building a bridge between Northern Ireland and Scotland is supported by members of a number of UK political parties. DUP MP Sammy Wilson compared the idea to the approved Channel Tunnel and HS2 projects. The party made a feasibility study into a tunnel or enclosed bridge a precondition to coalition support in the event of a hung parliament in the 2015 election, and again reiterated the potential for a sea bridge in January 2018. In January 2018, leading figures in the Democratic Unionist Party revived calls for a bridge or tunnel between Larne in County Antrim and Dumfries and Galloway; the estimated £20 billion cost of the  project would make it among the biggest infrastructure projects in UK history. The link was proposed by Wilson and Simon Hamilton, a former minister for the party in the Stormont administration.

The idea has been further endorsed as a potential solution to boost the economies of Scotland and Northern Ireland after Brexit.

Late 2010s "Celtic Crossing" 

The idea for a Scotland to Northern Ireland Bridge, sometimes branded in the press as the Celtic Crossing or Irish Sea Bridge, was revived in 2018, by Professor Alan Dunlop at the University of Liverpool. He proposed a combined road and rail crossing between Portpatrick, in Dumfries and Galloway, and Larne in Northern Ireland, stating that "the coastline between each country is more sheltered and the waterway better protected" than the English Channel, where, as Foreign Secretary, Boris Johnson had proposed a bridge. He suggested that this would create a 'Celtic powerhouse' due to the potential for an increase in trade between the two countries, and the increase in investment from the construction of the project which he put at between £15 billion and £20 billion (a fraction of the £120 billion cost of the proposed bridge over the English Channel).

By 2020, the British government had begun to officially undertake scoping into the possibility of an Irish Sea Bridge.

2020s Stranraer–Larne Sea Tunnel 
In February 2021, the Secretary of State for Scotland announced his support for a  sea tunnel from Stranraer to Larne, citing the weather impact on bridge opening and the need to avoid Beaufort's Dyke munitions dump as reasons for favouring a tunnel over a bridge. This proposal also received the support of the High-speed rail in the United Kingdom industry group.

It was also reported in February 2021 that a proposal was considered in government relating to an underground roundabout to be built under the Isle of Man to link Liverpool, Heysham, Stranraer and Larne.

In September 2021, it was announced that the entire proposal has been abandoned.

Holyhead–Dublin tunnel proposal 
In May 2021 British Transport Secretary Grant Shapps discussed the case for a tunnel between Holyhead and Dublin.

Routes

North Channel (Galloway) route 
A 2010 report by the Centre for Cross Border Studies estimated building a bridge between Galloway and Ulster would cost just under £20.5 billion. The proposal would see passengers board trains in Glasgow then cross on the bridge via Stranraer and alight in Belfast or Dublin. A longer bridge already exists between Shanghai and Ningbo in East China. Some political parties in Northern Ireland have included the bridge in their manifesto for some time. The sea trench was also used for dumping munitions after World War II, and so would require an expensive cleanup operation. Ronnie Hunter, former chairman of the Institute of Civil Engineers Scotland, suggested that the project was a "stretch but doable". He cited the lack of "soft rock, the chalk and sandstone" as a challenge compared to the construction of the Channel Tunnel. He also suggested that the change in rail gauge between Ireland and Great Britain might pose further concerns. Such a project was considered by railway engineer Luke Livingston Macassey in the 1890s as "a rail link using either a tunnel, a submerged "tubular bridge" or a solid causeway". The north channel crossing was the subject of a 2020 study by the United Kingdom government.

North Channel (Kintyre) route 

Irish Mail route 
Avoiding the Saint George's Channel immediately to the south of the route would keep the sea depth less than 300 feet (100 m).

Tuskar route 
The Institution of Engineers of Ireland's 2004 Vision of Transport in Ireland in 2050 imagines a tunnel to be built between the ports of Fishguard and Rosslare. A new container port on the Shannon Estuary linking a freight line to Europe is included. This report also includes ideas for a Belfast–Dublin–Cork high-speed train, and for a new freight line from Rosslare to Shannon.

Proposed fixed sea links between Great Britain and France

Second Channel tunnel or bridge
 The Channel Tunnel operates between Great Britain and France. It is a  rail tunnel linking Folkestone, Kent, in the United Kingdom, with Coquelles, Pas-de-Calais, near Calais in northern France, beneath the English Channel at the Strait of Dover. At its lowest point, it is 75 m (250 ft) deep. A second English Channel tunnel with a road was proposed in 2000 by Eurotunnel, as required by its contract for the original tunnel.

Channel Bridge
 An English Channel road bridge was proposed in 2018 by Boris Johnson, who was then foreign secretary.  It received limited support.

Proposed fixed sea links between The Channel Islands and France

Channel Islands Tunnel 
 The Channel Islands Tunnel was a proposed tunnel between Jersey and Lower Normandy. Talks between Jersey politicians and their French counterparts would be held in September 2009 to ascertain whether it would be of mutual benefit. The proposition included a road and rail link. The plans were not developed, and the then Assistant Minister for Planning and Environment Deputy Rob Duhamel who had suggested the idea lost his seat in the 2014 elections.
 The current Connect 3 Million (C3M) tunnel is a proposed tunnel between Guernsey, Jersey and Lower Normandy with the intention of developing a commuting population between Coutances in Lower Normandy and the Channel Islands. . The C3M tunnel was proposed by the outgoing president of the Guernsey Chamber of Commerce, Martyn Dorey in 2018 Support was obtained from the Chief Ministers of both islands in July 2019   to explore a pre feasibility study with Ramboll.  The initial study concluded that the project looked like it may be feasible, both technically and financially, and several route options were explored by Stephen Whitham from Ramboll, which included a shared airport between the islands on reclaimed land.  The proposed Phase I route was a single bore rail tunnel direct from St Peter Port underground to Jerbourg Point then heading undersea to below  Grosnez Castle, rising to a station at Jersey Airport and then back underground to St Helier.  The study explored the achievability of a journey time of a little over 15 minutes using Bombardier Talent 3 rolling stock.  In January 2020, the Guernsey Jersey link was reported by the local media to cost 2.6bln.  Transit speed and convenience was cited as a major factor to stimulate greater social cohesion between the islands and the financial viability of the project.   Low interest rates and the completion of proportionately similar (by GDP/per capita) projects in the Faroe Islands between Streymoy and Eysturoy in December 2020 have led to renewed calls to develop the idea to a full feasibility study in 2021.

Other proposed fixed sea links within or to the British & Irish Isles and associated areas

Isle of Man 
 In 2018 Professor Alan Dunlop, of the University of Liverpool, suggested a circa 18 mile bridge be built from Scotland to the Isle of Man.  This was in addition to his suggestion for a bridge connecting Northern Ireland to Scotland. He suggested that it would help open up the Isle of Man economy.
 In 2008 the Liverpool Echo ran an article suggesting the construction of a  bridge to the Isle of Man from Liverpool.  Despite the proposal being nothing more than an April Fools joke, the bridge was included in an engineering text book called the "Handbook of International Bridge Engineering" in its 2017 edition.

Shetland and Orkney
 A possible Orkney tunnel between Scotland and Orkney (about ) was publicly discussed especially around 2005, but also at other times.
 In 2014 a consultation was undertaken by Orkney Islands Council, with a view to considering a series of fixed links involving seven of the Orkney islands. This would include a bridge between the isles of Eday, Westray and Papa Westray, to alleviate the need for air travel—currently the shortest scheduled flight in the world, and also from Orkney to Shapinsay, Egilsay, Rousay and Wyre, but not a tunnel to Scotland this time.
 In 2019 a Shetland Island councilor warned that the island of Whalsay would suffer a "slow and painful death" if talks were not held on building a tunnel or fixed link to replace the ferry service.
 Bridges connecting Orkney to Shetland via the Fair Isle have been mooted at numerous times throughout history with varying degrees of seriousness.

Hebrides 
 In 2018 the Western Isles Council began plans to build a series of bridges and tunnels between the Outer Hebrides. The plans proposed bridges between the Sound of Harris and the Sound of Barra as a starting point. Ian Fordham, chairman of Outer Hebrides Tourism, suggested that the scheme would alleviate the pressure on the ferries that operate across the Outer Hebrides. Plans for a  tunnel between North Uist and Skye, thereby connecting the Outer Hebrides to the Mainland, had also been mooted. In June 2019 a delegation headed up by the Western Isles MP went to the Faroe Islands to assess its tunnel and bridge-link system to see how the infrastructure could be translated to the Hebrides. In 2019 Angus MacNeil MP, chair of the Commons International Trade Committee, voiced his support for the project, and also for a proposed bridge between the Sound of Kerrera off Oban and between Mull and the mainland to ensure the Inner Hebrides were also connected.

Isle of Wight 
 A bridge from mainland England to the Isle of Wight has been proposed a number of times, often due to the high cost of ferries to and from the island. The Isle of Wight Party—a political party active only in the Isle of Wight—was set up with the intention of campaigning for a fixed crossing. Critics have suggested that such a link may damage the ecology of the Isle of Wight, particularly the red squirrel population. Campaign group Pro-Link has put forward a number of plans to the Isle of Wight Infrastructure Task Force of the Isle of Wight council, including a £1.2 billion  dual-carriageway tunnel between Whippingham on the isle and Gosport. The campaign group has proposed the project be initially run on a toll basis, but that it would have paid for itself after eighteen years. In 2017 Abel Connections Ltd released their plans for the project, "to create a new north-south axis through the centre of the Solent region by constructing a tunnel from the M27 east of junction 9 to the Whippingham roundabout on the Isle of Wight, with an additional access intersection 'cut and cover' portal near the mainland coast between Browndown and Meon."

Isles of Scilly 
 Although bridges connecting some of the individual islands of the Isles of Scilly have been suggested at various points through history, the Cornwall Live newspaper ran a 2018 April Fools Day joke page suggesting that there was a secret plan to connect the Isles of Scilly to the mainland.

See also 

 Cross-sea traffic ways
 Severn Barrage
 Channel Tunnel
 Britannia Bridge
 Kingsferry Bridge
 Jubilee Bridge
 Skye Bridge
 Michaelson Road Bridge
 Langstone Bridge
 Menai Suspension Bridge
 Carrick-a-Rede Rope Bridge
 Morecambe Bay § Bridge and tidal barrage proposal
 River Ribble § Estuary crossing proposals
 Strait of Gibraltar crossing

References 

Proposed transport infrastructure in Scotland
Proposed bridges in the United Kingdom
Tunnels in the Republic of Ireland
Proposed undersea tunnels in Europe
Republic of Ireland–United Kingdom border
Borders of Scotland